Victoria Eugenie of Battenberg (Victoria Eugenie Julia Ena; 24 October 1887 – 15 April 1969) was Queen of Spain as the wife of King Alfonso XIII from their marriage on 31 May 1906 until 14 April 1931, when the Spanish Second Republic was proclaimed. A Hessian princess by birth, she was a member of the Battenberg family, a morganatic branch of the House of Hesse-Darmstadt. She was the youngest granddaughter of Queen Victoria. Unlike other members of the Battenberg family, who were accorded the lower rank of Serene Highness, Victoria Eugenie was born with the rank of Highness due to a Royal Warrant issued in 1886 by Queen Victoria.

Early life
Princess Victoria Eugenie of Battenberg was born on 24 October 1887 at Balmoral Castle, in Scotland. Her father was Prince Henry of Battenberg, the fourth child and third son of Prince Alexander of Hesse and by Rhine by his morganatic wife Countess Julia von Hauke, and her mother was Princess Beatrice, the fifth daughter of Queen Victoria of the United Kingdom and Prince Albert of Saxe-Coburg-Gotha. Her mother, as the youngest child of the lonely queen, was kept "at home" with the court, which happened to be at Balmoral when she went into labour. Victoria Eugenie was the last grandchild of a British monarch to be born in Scotland until Princess Margaret was born at Glamis Castle in Angus in 1930.

As Prince Henry was the product of a morganatic marriage, he took his style of Prince of Battenberg from his mother, who had been created Princess of Battenberg in her own right. As such, Henry's children would normally have been born with the style "Serene Highness"; however, Queen Victoria had issued a Royal Warrant on 4 December 1886 granting the higher style of "Highness" to all sons and daughters of Prince Henry and Princess Beatrice, thus she was born Her Highness Princess Victoria Eugenie of Battenberg. She was named for her grandmother Victoria and for her godmother Eugénie de Montijo, the Spanish-born French empress who lived in exile in the United Kingdom. To her family, and the British general public, she was known by a diminutive of the last of her names, as Ena. She was born in the 50th year of Queen Victoria’s reign, so she was called "the Jubilee baby".

She was baptised in the Drawing Room at Balmoral. Her godparents were Empress Eugénie (represented by Princess Frederica of Hanover), the German Crown Princess (her maternal aunt; represented by the Duchess of Roxburghe), the Princess of Battenberg (her paternal grandmother; represented by the Marchioness of Ely), Princess Christian of Schleswig-Holstein (her maternal aunt; represented by the Countess of Erroll), Prince Louis of Battenberg (her paternal uncle; represented by the Earl of Hopetoun) and the Duke of Edinburgh (her maternal uncle; represented by Sir Henry Ponsonby).

Victoria Eugenie grew up in Queen Victoria's household, as the British monarch had reluctantly allowed Beatrice to marry on the condition that she remain her mother's full-time companion and personal secretary. Therefore, she spent her childhood at Windsor Castle, Balmoral, and Osborne House on the Isle of Wight. She was a bridesmaid at the wedding of her cousins, the Duke (later King George V) and Duchess of York on 6 July 1893.

When she was six, Victoria Eugenie suffered a severe concussion when she was thrown off her pony at Osborne and hit her head on the ground. Queen Victoria's physicians noticed "dangerous symptoms", such as "evident signs of brain pressure, probably a haemorrhage." Her aunt Victoria, Princess Royal, wrote, "it is so grievous that [Victoria Eugenie] cannot take notice or open her eyes."

Victoria Eugenie was close to her grandmother Queen Victoria. She reflected that "having been born and brought up in her home, Queen Victoria was like a second mother to us. She was very kind but very strict, with old fashioned ideas of how children must be brought up." When Victoria Eugenie said, "I think it is time for us to go to bed," Queen Victoria corrected her. "Young woman, a princess should say, 'I think it is time for me to retire. Queen Victoria wrote that "I love these darling children so, almost as much as their own parent" and referred to Victoria Eugenie as "the little treasure."
Her father died while on active military service after contracting fever in Africa in 1896. After the death of Queen Victoria in 1901, the Battenbergs moved to London and took up residence in Kensington Palace.

Engagement

In 1905, King Alfonso XIII of Spain made an official state visit to the United Kingdom. Victoria Eugenie's uncle, King Edward VII, hosted a dinner in Buckingham Palace, in honour of the Spanish king. Alfonso was seated between Queen Alexandra and Princess Helena, King Edward's sister. He noticed Victoria Eugenie and asked who the dinner guest with almost white hair was. Everybody knew that King Alfonso was looking for a suitable bride and one of the strongest candidates was Princess Patricia of Connaught, another niece of King Edward. As Princess Patricia seemed not to be impressed by the Spanish monarch, Alfonso indulged his interest in Victoria Eugenie, and so the courtship began. When Alfonso returned to Spain he frequently sent postcards to Victoria Eugenie and spoke of her approvingly. His mother, Queen Maria Cristina, did not like her son's choice, in part because she considered the Battenbergs non-royal because of the obscure origin of Prince Henry's mother, and in part because she wanted her son to marry within her own family. Other obstacles to a marriage were religion (Alfonso was Roman Catholic, and Victoria Eugenie was Anglican); and, the potential problem of haemophilia, the disease that Queen Victoria had transmitted to some of her descendants. Victoria Eugenie's brother Leopold was a haemophiliac, so there was a 50% probability that she would be a carrier, although the degree of risk was not yet known. Still, if Alfonso married her, their issue could be affected by the disease. Nonetheless, Alfonso was not dissuaded.

After a year of rumours about which princess Alfonso would marry, his mother finally acceded to her son's selection in January 1906 and wrote a letter to Victoria Eugenie's mother, telling her about the love Alfonso felt for her daughter and seeking unofficial contact with the king. Some days later at Windsor, King Edward congratulated his niece on her future engagement.

Princess Beatrice and her daughter arrived in Biarritz on 22 January and stayed at the Villa Mauriscot where some days later King Alfonso met them. At the Villa Mauriscot, Alfonso and his future bride conducted a chaperoned, three-day romance. Then, Alfonso took Victoria Eugenie and her mother to San Sebastián to meet Queen Maria Cristina. On 3 February, the king left San Sebastian to go to Madrid and Victoria Eugenie and her mother went to Versailles where the Princess would be instructed in the Catholic faith: as the future Queen of Spain, she agreed to convert. The official reception of Victoria Eugenie into the Catholic faith took place on 5 March 1906 at Miramar Palace in San Sebastián.

The terms of the marriage were settled by two agreements, a public treaty and a private contractual arrangement. The treaty was executed between Spain and the United Kingdom in London on 7 May 1906 by their respective plenipotentiaries, the Spanish Ambassador to the Court of St. James's, Don Luis Polo de Bernabé, and the British Foreign Secretary, Sir Edward Grey, Bt. Ratifications were exchanged on 23 May following. Among other conditions, the treaty stipulated:BE it known unto all men by these Presents that whereas His Catholic Majesty Alfonso XIII, King of Spain, has judged it proper to announce his intention of contracting a marriage with Her Royal Highness Princess Victoria Eugénie Julia Ena, niece of His Majesty Edward VII, King of the United Kingdom of Great Britain and Ireland and of the British Dominions beyond the Seas, Emperor of India, and daughter of Her Royal Highness the Princess Beatrice Mary Victoria Feodore (Princess Henry of Battenberg)…Article I. It is concluded and agreed that the marriage between His said Majesty King Alfonso XIII and Her said Royal Highness the Princess Victoria Eugénie Julia Ena shall be solemnized in person at Madrid as soon as the same may conveniently be done. II. His said Majesty King Alfonso XIII engages to secure to Her said Royal Highness the Princess Victoria Eugénie Julia Ena from the date of her marriage with His Majesty, and for the whole period of the marriage, an annual grant of 450,000 pesetas. His said Majesty King Alfonso XIII also engages, if, by the will of Divine Providence, the said Princess Victoria Eugénie Julia Ena should become his widow, to secure to her, from the date of his death, an annual grant of 250,000 pesetas, unless and until she contracts a second marriage, both these grants having already been voted by the Cortes. The private settlements to be made on either side in regard to the said marriage will be agreed upon and expressed in a separate Contract, which shall, however, be deemed to form an integral part of the present Treaty…III. The High Contracting Parties take note of the fact that Her Royal Highness the Princess Victoria Eugénie Julia Ena, according to the due tenor of the law of England, forfeits for ever all hereditary rights of succession to the Crown and Government of Great Britain… The treaty's reference to the forfeiture of Victoria Eugénie's British succession rights reflected neither the British government's censure of the alliance nor any renunciation made by her. Rather, it was an explicit recognition of the fact that by marrying (and becoming) a Roman Catholic, Victoria Eugénie lost any right to inherit the British crown as a consequence of Britain's Act of Settlement. This exclusion was personal and limited: those among her descendants who do not become Roman Catholic remain in the line of succession to the British Throne.

Despite this treaty, concern about the reaction to the marriage and to Victoria Eugénie's conversion among Protestants was accommodated by the British government's decision that King Edward need not grant official consent to the marriage in his Privy Council, despite the fact that his niece was a British subject. Although the Royal Marriages Act of 1772 requires that descendants of King George II obtain the British sovereign's prior permission to marry by Order in Council, an exception exists for descendants of royal daughters who marry "into foreign families". Although the naturalisation of Victoria Eugénie's father in the United Kingdom had been initiated in Parliament a week prior to his marriage to Princess Beatrice, the nuptials were completed before the naturalisation, thus the Government was able to take the position that Victoria Eugénie was not bound by the Royal Marriages Act, and therefore the British king had legal authority neither to authorise nor forbid her marriage.

The King did, however, issue a royal warrant which read: "Our Will and Pleasure is and we do hereby declare and ordain that from and after the date of this Warrant our Most Dear Niece Princess Victoria Eugénie Julia Ena, only daughter of Our Most Dear Sister Beatrice Mary Victoria Feodore (Princess Henry of Battenberg) shall be styled entitled and called Her Royal Highness before her name and such Titles and Appellations which to her belong in all Deeds Records Instruments or Documents whatsoever wherein she may at any time hereafter be named or described. And We do hereby authorize and empower Our said Most Dear Niece henceforth at all times to assume and use and to be called and named by the Style, Title and Appellation of Her Royal Highness accordingly. Given at Our Court of Saint James's, the Third day of April 1906: in the Sixth Year of Our Reign. By His Majesty's Command. M Gladstone" Notice of this warrant was gazetted in the London Gazette which read: "Whitehall 3 April 1906. The KING has been graciously pleased to declare and ordain that His Majesty's niece, Her Highness Princess Victoria Eugenie Julia Ena, daughter of Her Royal Highness the Princess Beatrice Mary Victoria Feodore (Princess Henry of Battenberg), shall henceforth be styled and called "Her Royal Highness"; And to command that the said Royal concession and declaration be registered in His Majesty's College of Arms."

Queen of Spain

Princess Victoria Eugenie married King Alfonso XIII at the Royal Monastery of San Jerónimo in Madrid on 31 May 1906. Present at the ceremony were her widowed mother and brothers, as well as her cousins, the Prince and Princess of Wales.

After the wedding ceremony, as the royal procession was heading back to the Royal Palace, an assassination attempt was made on the King and Queen when anarchist Mateu Morral threw a bomb from a balcony at the royal carriage. Victoria Eugenie's life was saved because, at the exact moment the bomb exploded, she turned her head in order to see St. Mary's Church, which Alfonso was showing her. She escaped injury, although her dress was spotted with the blood of a guard who was riding beside the carriage. A large statue in front of the Royal Monastery of San Jeronimo commemorates the victims of the bombing of 31 May 1906.

After the inauspicious start to her tenure as Queen of Spain, Victoria Eugenie became isolated from the Spanish people and was unpopular in her new land. Her married life improved when she gave birth to a son and heir-apparent to the kingdom, Alfonso, Prince of Asturias. However, while the baby prince was being circumcised, the doctors noted that he did not stop bleeding — the first sign that the infant heir had haemophilia.  Victoria Eugenie was the obvious source of the condition, which was inherited by her eldest and youngest sons. Contrary to the response of Emperor Nicholas II of Russia, whose son and heir by another granddaughter of Queen Victoria was similarly afflicted, Alfonso is alleged never to have forgiven Victoria Eugenie nor to have come to terms with what had happened. In all, King Alfonso XIII and Queen Victoria Eugenie had seven children, five sons and two daughters. Neither of their daughters is known to have been a carrier of haemophilia.

After the births of their children, Victoria Eugenie's relationship with Alfonso deteriorated, and he had numerous affairs. It has been said that he had a dalliance with the Queen's cousin, Beatrice, Duchess of Galliera, but this is disputed. Then members of the king's circle spread rumours that Beatrice had been expelled because of her bad behaviour, which was not true. All this situation was very painful for the Queen, who could do nothing to help her cousin.

Victoria Eugenie devoted herself to work for hospitals and services for the poor, as well as to education. She was also involved in the reorganization of the Spanish Red Cross. In 1929, the city of Barcelona erected a statue of her in a nurse's uniform in honor of her Red Cross work (the statue has since been destroyed). Various Spanish landmarks have been named after Victoria Eugenie.  For instance, in 1909, Madrid's stately neoclassical bridge crossing the Manzanares River was named after her as the "Puente de la Reina Victoria".  In 1912, the monumental opera house and theater "Teatro Victoria Eugenia" in San Sebastián, Spain, was named after her. In 1920, she launched the Spanish Navy Cruiser Reina Victoria Eugenia which was named after her.

She was the 976th Dame of the Royal Order of Queen Maria Luisa. In 1923, the Pope conferred upon her the Golden Rose which was the first time this honor had been awarded to a British princess since 1555 when Pope Julius III conferred one upon Queen Mary I of England. She was also granted the Royal Order of Victoria and Albert by her grandmother, Queen Victoria. The Queen was also awarded the Spanish Red Cross Merit Order (First Class) and the jewelled breast star was paid for by a subscription undertaken by the Corps of Lady Nurses of the Spanish Red Cross.

Exile
The Spanish royal family went into exile on 14 April 1931 after municipal elections brought Republicans to power in most of the major cities, leading to the proclamation of the Second Spanish Republic. Alfonso XIII had hoped that his voluntary exile might avert a civil war between the Republicans and the Monarchists. The family went to live in France and later Italy. Victoria Eugenie and Alfonso later separated, and she lived partly in the UK and in Switzerland. She purchased a chateau, the Vieille Fontaine, outside Lausanne.

In 1938, the whole family gathered in Rome for the baptism at the Palazzo Malta of Alfonso and Victoria Eugenie's son Juan's eldest son, Juan Carlos, by Vatican Cardinal Secretary of State Eugenio Pacelli (who stood in for the dying Pope Pius XI and would himself become Pope Pius XII in a few months). On 15 January 1941, Alfonso, feeling his death was near, transferred his rights to the Spanish crown to his son, the Count of Barcelona. On 12 February, Alfonso suffered a first heart attack. Alfonso died on 28 February 1941. In 1942  Victoria Eugenie was obliged to leave Italy, having become persona non grata to the Italian government, according to Harold Tittmann, a U.S. representative at the Vatican at the time, for her "ill-disguised leanings to the Allied cause."

Victoria Eugenie returned briefly to Spain in February 1968, to stand as godmother at the baptism of her great-grandson, Infante Felipe, the son of Infante Juan Carlos and Princess Sophia of Greece and Denmark. Felipe became King of Spain after his father, King Juan Carlos I, abdicated in June 2014.

Death
Victoria Eugenie died in Lausanne on 15 April 1969, aged 81, exactly 38 years after she had left Spain for exile. She was the last surviving child of Princess Beatrice of the United Kingdom and Prince Henry of Battenberg. The funeral was held in the church of Sacré Coeur, she was buried in the nearby cemetery Bois-de-Vaux in Lausanne. On 25 April 1985, her remains were returned to Spain and re-interred in the Royal Vault in the Escorial, outside Madrid, next to the remains of her husband, Alfonso XIII, and not far from her sons, Infante Alfonso, Infante Jaime, and Infante Gonzalo.

Legacy

After the death of Spanish dictator Francisco Franco in 1975, the monarchy was restored and Victoria Eugenie's grandson Juan Carlos I became King of Spain; her great-grandson Felipe VI is the current king. Her godchildren included the Prince of Monaco, Queen Fabiola of Belgium, and Cayetana Fitz-James Stuart, 18th Duchess of Alba.

Victoria Eugenie's Cartier tiara of diamonds set with pearls (or alternatively with emeralds) was left to her daughter, Infanta Maria Cristina, Countess of Marone. It is now worn by the Queen of Spain.  In addition, her Ansorena fleur-de-lis tiara given to her by Alfonso XIII at her wedding has become the most important tiara in the Spanish Royal collection and is worn by the Queen of Spain for important state occasions.

A sapphire ring owned by Victoria Eugenie was sold at Sotheby's in May 2012 for $50,000.
That same year, Sotheby's also sold at auction Victoria Eugenie's diamond and pink conch shell bracelet by Cartier for the extraordinary price of $3.4 million.

Honours and arms

Orders and decorations
  Grand Cross of the Imperial Austrian Order of Elizabeth, 1908
  Dame of the Order of the Starry Cross
   Grand Cross of the Order of Saint-Charles, (19 April 1958)

Arms

Other versions

Issue

Ancestry

References

Further reading
 
 "Franco at Bourbon Prince's Baptism", The Times, 9 February 1968, p. 4, column 4.
 "Queen Victoria Eugénie, Granddaughter of Queen Victoria (Obituary)", The Times, 16 April 1969, p. 12, column E.

External links

 Royal House of Spain
 Treaty between the United Kingdom and Spain for the Marriage of His Majesty the King of Spain with Her Royal Highness Princess Victoria Eugenie Julia Ena - 7 May 1906

|-

|-

|-

1887 births
1969 deaths
Alfonso XIII of Spain
Battenberg family
Burials in the Pantheon of Kings at El Escorial
Converts to Roman Catholicism from Anglicanism
German princesses
House of Bourbon (Spain)
Ladies of the Royal Order of Victoria and Albert
People from Marr
Grand Cordons of the Order of the Precious Crown
Scottish Roman Catholics
Spanish royal consorts
Royal reburials